Je te serai fidèle is a 2003 French language album by Canadian singer Roch Voisine. It includes six new songs and nine entirely revamped hits.

Track listing
 "Ne m’oublie pas" 
 "Tant pis"  
 "Darlin'"
 "La Berceuse du petit diable" (Little Devil's Lullaby)
 "On mentira"
 "Je l'ai vu"
 "Laisse-là rêver" (She Had A Dream)
 "My lady mio segreto" (Ma Lady, Mon Secret)
 "Délivre-moi" (Deliver Me)
 "Ouvre les yeux" 
 "Pourtant"
 "Avant de partir"
 "On a tous une étoile" 
 "Je te serai fidèle" ("I'll Always Be There")
 "Hélène"

External links
Roch Voisine Official site album page

2003 albums
Roch Voisine albums